Helen Hart is a British children's writer known best as, Maya Snow.

Career
Hart, been a published author since 1999, especially under pseudonyms for Scholastic, Virgin Books, OUP, HarperCollins and a range of overseas publishers. 
Her work has been translated into many languages including Swedish, Danish, Japanese and Greek.

One of her Young Adult novels, written as Maya Snow, was shortlisted for the Solihull Children's Book Award 2010.

Helen is one of the founding partners of publishing consultancy, SilverWood Books which helps writers get their work into print. 
She is the co-founder of the successful 'Get Published Masterclass' in Bristol and was a judge for the Bristol Short Story Prize in 2010 and 2011. 
Her most recent book is the swashbuckling pirate adventure The Black Banner.
 
She is represented by London literary agency Pollinger Ltd.

Works

 Vampire Plagues series as Sebastian Rook
Book 4: Outbreak (Scholastic) 2005, 
Book 5: Epidemic (Scholastic) 2005, 
Book 6: Extermination (Scholastic) 2006, 
 Sisters of the Sword Series as Maya Snow

Sisters of the Sword 4: The Battle Dawns, HarperCollins, 2010, 
 The Black Banner as Helen Hart (SilverWood Originals) 2011,

References

External links
Helen Hart at Wordpress.com
SilverWood Books
Interview by Layered Pages
 
 

Living people
British children's writers
British women novelists
21st-century British novelists
21st-century British women writers
Year of birth missing (living people)